Thaddeus Brown Glover (1852–1932) was a United States Army officer who received the Medal of Honor. His award came for gallantry during the American Indian Wars.

Life 
Glover was born on January 2, 1852, and joined the United States Army in March 1876. Glover was assigned to Company B, of the 2nd Cavalry Regiment. Glover was awarded the Medal of Honor for his actions, on the dates of April 10, 1879, and February 10, 1880. He left the Army in March 1881, and later served as a Major in the Quartermaster Corps from January 1917 to October 1919.

Thaddeus Brown Glover died on December 18, 1932. He is buried at the Willow Hill Cemetery, in Southold, in Suffolk County, New York, United States.

Medal of Honor citation
The President of the United States of America, in the name of Congress, takes pleasure in presenting the Medal of Honor to Sergeant Thaddeus Brown Glover, United States Army, for extraordinary heroism.

Rank and organization: Sergeant, Company B, 2nd United States Cavalry Regiment. Place and date: At Mizpah Creek, Montana, and Pumpkin Creek, Montana, April 10, 1879 and February 10, 1880. Entered service at: United States. Born: January 2, 1852. Date of issue: November 20, 1897.

Citation:
"While in charge of small scouting parties, fought, charged, surrounded, and captured war parties of Sioux Indians".

See also 
 2nd United States Cavalry Regiment
 List of Medal of Honor recipients for the Indian Wars

References 

American Indian Wars recipients of the Medal of Honor
1852 births
1932 deaths
United States Army Medal of Honor recipients
United States Army officers
Military personnel from New York (state)